Sangabora is a 2016 Indian Bengali-language adventure film written and directed by Bulan Bhattacharjee. Starring Soumitra Chatterjee, Samadarshi Dutta and Bidita Bag, the film explores the adventures of a college-goer and his team as they find a mysterious stone which turns out to be a treasure map.

Sangabora premiered at Priya Cinema, Kolkata and opened in limited release on 25 March 2016.

Plot 
Following puzzling events involving the disappearance of two documentary filmmakers; Arka, a college-goer, comes across a village where an ancient stone was recently discovered. He finds a primeval inscription on the stone and decides to investigate further with the aid of his maternal uncle and Barsha, a linguist. After a strange turn of events which connects the stone to the missing filmmakers; they set out for a mission to find them, leading them to a remote village named Gorang. They soon realize that they are being hunted by a gang who were after the stone, since it was nothing but a treasure map.

Cast 

 Soumitra Chatterjee
 Samadarshi Dutta
 Bidita Bag
 Kaushik Sen
 Kharaj Mukherjee
 Priyanshu Chatterjee
 Sampurna Lahiri

Production 
Made with a limited budget Sangabora was filmed at Gujarat, Kolkata, Mumbai and Visakhapatnam for over 32 days and was completed by October 2015.

Release 
A logo of the film was released on 18 February 2016, at the Kolkata Press Club. The poster was launched on 9 March 2016, at The Peerless Inn, Kolkata. The film had its theatrical release on 25 March 2016.

Critical response 

The film received mixed reviews from critics. Anusree Gupta of NEWSMEN wrote– "Sangabora promised a mix of adventure and mystery: it had a strong plot and talented actors, but the execution has been very poor." Applauding Kharaj Mukherjee's acting, Gupta stated that ill-timed shots and forced romance sequences pulled the quality down. Chitra Home Chowdhury of Dekh News found Soumitra Chatterjee's performance "powerful" and wrote that the film was "beautifully picturized".

Soundtrack 
The soundtrack album for Sangabora was composed by Raja Narayan Deb, which includes three original songs and a theme song. Shreya Ghoshal, Javed Ali, Neeti Mohan, Timir Biswas, Kaushik Chakraborty and Arko Mukherjee contributed to the vocals.

References

External links 
 
 

Indian adventure films
Indian mystery films
Bengali-language Indian films
2010s Bengali-language films
Films scored by Raja Narayan Deb